Kenneth Tarver is an American operatic tenor, born in Detroit. He has appeared at some of the world's most prestigious opera houses, such as the Royal Opera House Covent Garden, Municipal Theatre of Santiago in Chile (as Lindoro in L'Italiana in Algeri  ), Wiener Staatsoper, Deutsche Oper Berlin, Staatsoper Unter den Linden, Bayerische Staatsoper, Dresden Semperoper, Gran Teatre del Liceu Barcelona, Opéra Comique París, Teatro Lirico Giuseppe Verdi in Trieste, La Monnaie Brussels, Metropolitan Opera, Washington (as Prince Ramiro in La Cenerentola ) and Teatro San Carlo Naples.

Recently he sang the role of Orfeo in Joseph Haydn’s L’anima del filosofo at the Budapest Festival, Christoph Willibald Gluck’s Orphèe et Euridice at Staatsoper Stuttgart, Wolfgang Amadeus Mozart’s Idomeneo at La Monnaie and L’infedelta delusa (Haydn) at the Musikverein Vienna. In 2016, Valéry Gergiev records with LSO and LSO Chorus Berlioz's Roméo et Juliette with Kenneth Tarver as tenor.''

References

External links 
 Official website
 Kenneth Tarver at Boris Orlob Management
 Streamopera.com/Kenneth Tarver

Living people
American operatic tenors
Year of birth missing (living people)
21st-century American opera singers
21st-century African-American male singers
21st-century American male singers
21st-century American singers